Mahottari (Nepali: महोत्तरी ) is a rural municipality in Mahottari District in Madhes Province  of Nepal. It was formed in 2016 occupying current 6 sections (wards) from previous 6 former VDCs. It occupies an area of 28.08 sq. km with a total population of 27,430. Dilip Kumar Pandey of Terai Madhesh Loktantrik Party is the current chairman of the rural municipality who was elected from 2022 local elections.

Geography 
East: Pipra

West: Ekdara

North: Loharpatti and Balwa

South: Jaleshwar

Population 
As per 2017, Mahottari hosts a population of 27,784 across a total area of 28.08 km2.

See also
Mahottari District

References

Populated places in Mahottari District
Rural municipalities in Mahottari District
Rural municipalities of Nepal established in 2017
Rural municipalities in Madhesh Province